The 2012 Polish Super Cup was held on 12 August 2012 between the 2011–12 Ekstraklasa winners Śląsk Wrocław and the 2011–12 Polish Cup winners Legia Warsaw. Śląsk Wrocław won the match on penalties after the match finished 1–1, winning the trophy for the second time in their history.

Match details

See also
2011–12 Ekstraklasa
2011–12 Polish Cup

References

SuperCup
Polish Super Cup
Polish Super Cup 2012